Community Food Projects is a program administered by the Cooperative State Research, Education and Extension Service providing one-time matching grants to private non-profit entities to establish and carry out multi-purpose projects designed to increase food security on a local, community-based level. Project objectives are to meet the needs of low-income people by increasing their access to fresher, more nutritious food supplies; to increase the self-reliance of communities in providing for their own food needs; and to promote comprehensive responses to local food, farm, and nutrition issues.  Congress has provided from $1 million to $2.5 million annually for the program in recent years, which USDA has used to make grants ranging from $10,000 to $250,000 each.

See also
Community gardens in Nebraska

References 

 Local Organization Receives Grant to Fund Local Farms | NBC 10 Philadelphia

United States Department of Agriculture programs